Arrouya may refer to one of four wine grape varieties:

Arrouya noir
Cabernet Franc
Fer
Manseng noir